Trance-Fusion is an album by Frank Zappa. Released posthumously in 2006, 13 years after the musician's death, the album forms the third in a trilogy of instrumental albums which focus on Zappa's improvised guitar solos, after Shut Up 'n Play Yer Guitar (1981) and Guitar (1988). Trance-Fusion was among the last albums completed by Zappa before his death, along with The Rage & The Fury: The Music Of Edgard Varèse, Dance Me This and Civilization Phaze III. It was also among the first releases by Zappa to be made available digitally via iTunes through Gail Zappa's distribution deal with Universal Music Enterprises.

Reception

AllMusic wrote that Trance-Fusion "took way too long to see the light of day (and with cover art more suited to a Kitaro album), but for the FZ faithful it was worth the wait. Keep your fingers crossed for more."

Track listing 
All tracks written, composed and arranged by Frank Zappa.

Personnel 
 Frank Zappa – guitar, all tracks
 Dweezil Zappa – guitar on tracks 1 and 16
 Adrian Belew – rhythm guitar on track 2
 Warren Cuccurullo – rhythm guitar on track 6
 Mike Keneally – rhythm guitar and keyboards on tracks 1, 4, 7, 8, 9, 11, 13, 15, and 16
 Denny Walley – slide guitar on track 6
 Ray White – rhythm guitar on tracks 3, 5, 10, 12, and 14
 Ike Willis – rhythm guitar on tracks 3, 5, 10, 12, and 14
 Tommy Mars – keyboards on tracks 2 and 6
 Bobby Martin – keyboards on tracks 1, 3, 4, 5, 7, 8, 9, 10, 11, 12, 13, 14, 15, and 16
 Peter Wolf – keyboards on tracks 2 and 6
 Allan Zavod – keyboards on tracks 3, 5, 10, 12, and 14
 Scott Thunes – bass and mini-Moog on tracks 1, 3, 4, 5, 7, 8, 9, 10, 11, 12, 13, 14, 15, and 16
 Patrick O'Hearn – bass on track 2
 Arthur Barrow – bass on track 6 (uncredited in the booklet)
 Chad Wackerman – drums and percussion on tracks 1, 3, 4, 5, 7, 8, 9, 10, 11, 12, 13, 14, 15, and 16
 Terry Bozzio – drums on track 2
 Ed Mann – percussion on tracks 1, 2, 4, 6, 7, 8, 9, 11, 13, 15, and 16
 Paul Carman – alto, soprano, and baritone saxophone on tracks 1, 4, 7, 8, 9, 11, 13, 15, and 16
 Albert Wing – tenor saxophone on tracks 1, 4, 7, 8, 9, 11, 13, 15, and 16
 Kurt McGettrick – baritone, bass saxophone and contrabass clarinet on tracks 1, 4, 7, 8, 9, 11, 13, 15, and 16
 Walt Fowler – trumpet, flugelhorn and keyboards on tracks 1, 4, 7, 8, 9, 11, 13, 15, and 16
 Bruce Fowler – trombone on tracks 1, 4, 7, 8, 9, 11, 13, 15, and 16
 Vinnie Colaiuta – drums on track 6

References

External links 
 Trance-Fusion at Zappa.com

Live albums published posthumously
Frank Zappa live albums
2006 live albums
Zappa Records albums